Diary of a Lost Girl is a 1929 German silent film directed by G. W. Pabst and starring American silent star Louise Brooks. It is shot in black and white, and various versions of the film range from 79 minutes to 116 minutes in length. This was Brooks' second and last film with Pabst, and like their prior collaboration, Pandora's Box, it is considered to be a classic by many film historians. It is based on the controversial and bestselling 1905 novel of the same name by Margarete Böhme. The novel had been previously adapted by Richard Oswald as Diary of a Lost Woman.

Plot

Thymian Henning, the innocent, naive daughter of pharmacist Robert Henning, is puzzled when their housekeeper, Elisabeth, leaves suddenly on the day of Thymian's confirmation. It turns out that her father has got Elisabeth pregnant. Elisabeth's body is brought to the pharmacy later that day, an apparent suicide by drowning, upsetting Thymian.

Thymian's father's assistant Meinert, promises to explain it all to her late that night, but instead rapes her while she is unconscious and she also becomes pregnant.  Though Thymian refuses to name the illegitimate baby's father, the relatives find out from her diary, and decide that the best solution is for her to marry Meinert. When she refuses because she does not love him, they give the baby to a midwife and send her to a strict reformatory for wayward girls run by a tyrannical woman and her tall, bald assistant.

Meanwhile, Thymian's friend, Count Osdorff, is cast off and left penniless by his rich uncle, also Count Osdorff, after he proves unsuccessful at every school and trade. Thymian begs her friend to persuade her father to take her back, but Thymian's father has married his new housekeeper, Meta, and Meta wants no rivals for Robert's affection.  Rebelling against the reformatory's rigid discipline, Thymian and her friend Erika escape with Osdorff's help. When Thymian goes to see her baby, she is told the child has just died. After despondently wandering the streets, she re-unites with Erika, who is working in a small, upper-class brothel. With no skills, Thymian also becomes a prostitute.

By chance, Thymian encounters her father, Meta, and Meinert in a nightclub. Her father is shocked when he realizes what she has become, and Meta and Meinert prevent them from speaking by quickly ushering Robert out of the nightclub. Three years later, her father dies. With the expectation of inheriting a large amount of money, Thymian decides to start a new life. Her friends at the brothel suggest she obtain a new identity by marrying Osdorff. After thinking about it, he agrees. At the lawyer's office, Meinert buys Thymian's interest in the pharmacy, making her rich. However, when she learns that Meinert is throwing Meta and her two children out on the street, Thymian gives Meta the money so that her young half-sister will not suffer her fate.

Osdorff, who had been counting on the money to rebuild a life for himself too, throws himself out the window to his death when she tells him what she has done.  The uncle, grief-stricken, decides to make amends by taking care of Thymian. He introduces her to his cousin as his niece, Countess Osdorff. In a strange twist of fate, Thymian is invited to become a director of the same reformatory where she herself was once held. When Erika, her old friend, is brought before the directors as an "especially difficult case", Thymian denounces the school and its "blessings" and takes Erika out of the room. Count Osdorff follows the two women; but before leaving he pauses, turns back toward his startled cousin, and declares, "A little more love and no-one would be lost in this world!"

Cast

Release
Diary of a Lost Girl premiered in Vienna, Austria on 12 September 1929. It had its German premiere in Berlin on 15 October 1929.

References

Bibliography

External links
 
 
 Diary of a Lost Girl filmography page at Louise Brooks Society

1929 films
1929 drama films
1920s pregnancy films
German silent feature films
German black-and-white films
Films about prostitution in Germany
Films about sexual repression
Films directed by G. W. Pabst
Films of the Weimar Republic
Remakes of German films
German drama films
Silent drama films
1920s German films
Films about rape